Luc Rocheleau (born 4 March 1965) is a Canadian fencer. He competed in the individual and team foil events at the 1988 Summer Olympics.

He appeared in Tous pour un, un pour tous (All For One, and One For All) a 1993 National Film Board of Canada documentary about Quebec fencers trying to make the 1988 Canadian Olympic team, directed by Diane Létourneau.

References

External links
 

1965 births
Living people
Canadian male foil fencers
Olympic fencers of Canada
Fencers at the 1988 Summer Olympics
Fencers from Montreal
French Quebecers
Pan American Games medalists in fencing
Pan American Games silver medalists for Canada
Pan American Games bronze medalists for Canada
Fencers at the 1987 Pan American Games